Lisofylline (LSF) is a synthetic small molecule with novel anti-inflammatory properties. LSF can effectively prevent type 1 diabetes in preclinical models and improves the function and viability of isolated or transplanted pancreatic islets.  It is a metabolite of pentoxifylline.

As well, LSF improves cellular mitochondrial function and blocks interleukin-12 (IL-12) signaling and STAT-4 activation in target cells and tissues. IL-12 and STAT-4 activation are important pathways linked to inflammation and autoimmune damage to insulin producing cells. Therefore, LSF and related analogs could provide a new therapeutic approach to prevent or reverse type 1 diabetes. LSF also directly reduces glucose-induced changes in human kidney cells suggesting that LSF and analogs have the potential to treat the complications associated with diabetes.

Synthesis
The R enantiomer of the pentoxyfylline analogue in which the ketone has been reduced to an alcohol shows enhanced activity as an inhibitor of acetyl CoA over the parent drug.

For analogs see:

Further reading

References

External links 
University of Virginia Research Announcement
National Institute of Health on Lisofylline
Metabolism of lisofylline in the human liver

Anti-inflammatory agents
Xanthines